Samuel James Tilden Sheckard (November 23, 1878 – January 15, 1947) was an American left fielder in Major League Baseball who played for the Brooklyn Bridegrooms/Superbas (1897–98, 1900–01, 1902–05), Baltimore Orioles (NL) (1899), Baltimore Orioles (AL) (1902), Chicago Cubs (1906–12), St. Louis Cardinals (1913) and Cincinnati Reds (1913).

Sheckard was the Chicago Cubs' leadoff batter for the final game of the 1908 World Series. His team played in four World Series in a five-year span from 1906-1910.

Career

Sheckard was born in Chanceford Township, York County, Pennsylvania. He enjoyed a great 1901 season with the Superbas, hitting .353 with 11 home runs and 104 runs batted in, and leading the league with 19 triples and a .534 slugging average. In that season Sheckard became the first and so far only player to hit inside the park grand slams in two consecutive games.

With Baltimore in 1899, Sheckard led the league with 77 stolen bases. He played in four World Series with the Cubs, winning championships in 1907 and 1908; and he led the league in 1911 with 121 runs and 147 walks – a major league record until broken by Babe Ruth in 1920, and still a team record.

He also had the dubious distinction of going hitless in 21 at-bats in the 1906 World Series, won by the Chicago White Sox over the Cubs.

Sheckard was the first man to lead the league in homers and steals in the same season (1903). Ty Cobb (1909) and Chuck Klein (1932) are the only other players to do so in the majors.

Sheckard was also a good outfielder.  He holds the all-time single season major league record for double plays at two separate positions.  His 12 double plays as a left fielder in 1911 for the Cubs is 2 more than any other left fielder in history.  And in 1899, while playing for the Baltimore Orioles, Sheckard played right field and set the record for double plays by a right fielder with 14.  See related article on all time double play leaders.

After the 1913 season, Sheckard retired. When the Reds traded Joe Tinker, creating a managerial vacancy, Sheckard warned that Tinker's replacement would have a tough job ahead. "No matter who gets Tinker's place, the new manager will have to get rid of the 'knockers' on that club before he can hope to succeed. There is no chance to win with players who think more of their own records than they do of the success of the club."

In his 17-year career, Sheckard hit .274, with 56 home runs, 813 RBI, 1296 runs, 354 doubles, 136 triples, and 465 stolen bases in 2122 games played. In 1911, he set the single season record for walks with 147 before it was broken by Babe Ruth in 1920. He is one of only four players in the modern era (1900-present) to hold this record along with Ruth, Jack Crooks, and Barry Bonds. Sheckard is also the all-time leader among left fielders in assists, with 243.

Sheckard died at age 68 in Lancaster, Pennsylvania, from injuries suffered when he was hit by a car while walking to work along a highway.

Highlights
 Twice led league in stolen bases (1899, 1903)
 Led league in home runs (1903)
 Led league in runs (1911)
 Led league in triples (1901)
 Led league times on base (1911)

See also
 List of Major League Baseball career hits leaders
 List of Major League Baseball career triples leaders
 List of Major League Baseball career runs scored leaders
 List of Major League Baseball annual home run leaders
 List of Major League Baseball annual runs scored leaders
 List of Major League Baseball annual stolen base leaders
 List of Major League Baseball annual triples leaders
 List of Major League Baseball career stolen bases leaders

References

External links

  SABR Biography of Sheckard
 

1878 births
1947 deaths
19th-century baseball players
Baseball players from Pennsylvania
National League home run champions
National League stolen base champions
Major League Baseball left fielders
Brooklyn Bridegrooms players
Baltimore Orioles (1901–02) players
Brooklyn Superbas players
Chicago Cubs players
St. Louis Cardinals players
Cincinnati Reds players
Minor league baseball managers
Lancaster Maroons players
Portsmouth Browns players
York White Roses players
Chambersburg Maroons players
Brockton Shoemakers players
Cleveland Bearcats players
People from York County, Pennsylvania
Road incident deaths in Pennsylvania
Pedestrian road incident deaths